James Arnold may refer to:

Musicians 
Kokomo Arnold (James Arnold, 1901–1968), blues musician
Jimmy Arnold (musician) (1932–2004), founding member of The Four Lads
James Arnold, singer and keyboardist of the post-hardcore band Before Their Eyes

Others 
James Arnold (1781–1868), whaling merchant and benefactor of the Arnold Arboretum in Boston, Massachusetts
James Arnold (author & artist) (1909–1999), English author and artist
James Arnold (Australian politician) (1902–1967), Australian Senator
James Arnold (cricketer) (1869–1944), English cricketer
James Arnold (New Zealand politician) (1859–1929), New Zealand politician and trade unionist
James Edward Arnold (1939–2007), California businessman
James Henry Arnold (1759–1836), British lawyer, Admiralty Advocate and fellow of the Royal Society
James Newell Arnold (1844–1927), collector and publisher of genealogical and historical records of the state of Rhode Island
James R. Arnold (1923–2012), planetary scientist and chemist

See also
Jim Arnold (disambiguation)
Jamie Arnold (disambiguation)